The Boston Braves finished their inaugural 1932 season with a record of four wins, four losses, and two ties, and finished in fourth place in the National Football League (NFL).

Regular season

Schedule

Standings

Boston Redskins seasons
Boston Redskins
1932 in sports in Massachusetts
Boston Braves (NFL)